The high jump at the Summer Olympics is grouped among the four track and field jumping events held at the multi-sport event. The men's high jump has been present on the Olympic athletics programme since the first Summer Olympics in 1896. The women's high jump was one of five events to feature on the first women's athletics programme in 1928, and it was the only jumping event available to women until 1948, when the long jump was permitted.

The women's world record has been broken on three occasions at the Olympics, with records coming in 1928, 1932 and 1972.

Ellery Clark was the first Olympic champion in 1896 and Ethel Catherwood became the first female Olympic high jump champion 32 years later. Following the 2020 Olympics, Gianmarco Tamberi from Italy and Mutaz Essa Barshim from Qatar are the reigning men's Olympic champions and Mariya Lasitskene representing the Russian Olympic Committee is the reigning women's Olympic champion. Only two athletes have won two Olympic high jump titles, both women: Iolanda Balaș and Ulrike Meyfarth.

A standing high jump variant of the event was contested from 1900 to 1912 and standing jumps specialist Ray Ewry won all but one of the gold medals in its brief history.

Medalists

Men

Multiple medalists

Medalists by country

Women

Multiple medalists

Medalists by country

Standing high jump

From 1900 to 1912 a variation of the event was contested at the Olympics where athletes had to high jump from a standing position. This was one of three standing jumps to have featured on the Olympic programme, alongside the standing long jump (present for the same period) and the standing triple jump (1900 and 1904 only).

The standing jump competitions were dominated by Ray Ewry, who won the Olympic standing high jump titles in 1900, 1904 and 1908. Ewry took Olympic three gold medals in standing jumps in both 1900 and 1904, then won the standing high and long jumps at the 1908 Olympics, as well as the 1906 Intercalated Games. After Ewry's retirement, Platt Adams became the winner of the final Olympic standing high jump competition in 1912.

The standing high jump—and standing jump events in general—had been a relatively common type of athletics event at the end of the 19th century, but became increasingly rare at top level national and international competitions as the 20th century progressed. The Olympic event remains the only major international competition to have featured the event, except for the 1919 and 1920 editions of the South American Championships in Athletics. The standing high jump retained some popularity as a championship event in Scandinavia in the second half of the century.

Intercalated Games
The 1906 Intercalated Games were held in Athens and at the time were officially recognised as part of the Olympic Games series, with the intention being to hold a games in Greece in two-year intervals between the internationally held Olympics. However, this plan never came to fruition and the International Olympic Committee (IOC) later decided not to recognise these games as part of the official Olympic series. Some sports historians continue to treat the results of these games as part of the Olympic canon.

Continuing its presence since the first Olympics, a men's high jump event was contested at the 1906 Games. The competition rules were exhausting for the athletes as the bar was incremented by one centimetre each time and all athletes had to attempt each height. This caused the event to be postponed when darkness fell and competition resumed the following morning. Irishman Con Leahy won the event for Great Britain with a mark of 1.775 m. Lajos Gönczy of Hungary, a 1900 high jump medallist, returned to the Olympic podium with 1.75 m for second. American Bert Kerrigan, who also competed in the pole vault and standing long jump, took third place alongside Themistoklis Diakidis of Greece.

The standing high jump variant was also contested at the Intercalated Games.

Non-canonical Olympic events
In addition to the main 1900 Olympic men's high jump, a handicap competition was held four days later. All of the podium finishers in the event had failed to medal in the main Olympic final. Tore Blom was first with 2.05 m (35 cm handicap), Gyula Strausz placed second in 2.00 m (also 35 cm), while third place went to Waldemar Steffen with 1.95 m (30 cm handicap).

Two professionals-only contests were held in 1900. Mike Sweeney of the United States won with 1.80 m (the second best of the festival after Irv Baxter Olympic record in the amateur event). Another American, Otto Bruno Schoenfeld, was second in 1.75 m, while Noël Douet of France was third in 1.55 m. A handicap professional contest was also held but the results have not been located.

The handicap event returned at the 1904 Summer Olympics and the three Olympic finalists who failed to win medals comprised the top three. Ervin Barker won with 1.88 m off a 4.5 inch handicap, Lajos Gönczy was runner-up with a mark of 1.80 m with a three-inch handicap, and Emil Freymark took third, recording 1.80 m with a five-inch handicap.

These events are no longer considered part of the official Olympic history of the high jump or the athletics programme in general. Consequently, medals from these competitions have not been assigned to nations on the all-time medal tables.

References
Participation and athlete data
Athletics Men's High Jump Medalists. Sports Reference. Retrieved on 2014-05-03.
Athletics Women's High Jump Medalists. Sports Reference. Retrieved on 2014-05-03.
Olympic record progressions
Mallon, Bill (2012). TRACK & FIELD ATHLETICS - OLYMPIC RECORD PROGRESSIONS. Track and Field News. Retrieved on 2014-05-03.
Specific

External links
IAAF high jump homepage
Official Olympics website
Olympic athletics records from Track & Field News

 
Olympics
High jump